Cucureasa River may refer to the following rivers in Romania:

 Cucureasa, a tributary of the Ilva in Bistrița-Năsăud County
 Cucureasa, a tributary of the Teșna in Suceava County

See also 
 Cuca River (disambiguation)
 Cucuieți River (disambiguation)